Markhamia stipulata ( or แคป่า, khae hua mu or khae pa; , xi nan mao wei mu) is a species of plant in the family Bignoniaceae. It is native to South China and Southeast Asia.
This species usually grows as a tall tree, reaching heights of 5–15 m. Stipulata thrives in sparsely treed areas, such as fields. Flowers are pale yellow to reddish brown.

Uses
The flower is edible and is part of both Lao cuisine and Thai cuisine, where it is known as Dok Khae Hua Mu or Dok Khae Pa. The flowers are usually eaten sauteed or in Kaeng som. The leaves are also used in traditional Thai medicine.

See also 
Sesbania grandiflora, known as ดอกแค dok khae in Thai 
Edible flower
List of Thai ingredients

References

External links

Flora of China
Flora of Laos
Flora of Thailand
Flora of Vietnam
stipulata
Lamiales of Asia